Petru Pavel Aron (1709–1764) was Bishop of Făgăraş and Primate of the Romanian Greek Catholic Church from 1752 to his death in 1764. He also translated the Biblia Vulgata into Romanian (1760–1761).

Life
Petru Pavel Aron was born Bistra in 1709. He studied by the Jesuits in Cluj and later in Trnava where he studied philosophy. He continued his studies of theology in the College of the Propaganda, Rome, where he remained till his doctorate in 1744. While in Rome, he took the monastic vows in the Basilian Order on 26 May 1742, and on 4 August 1743 he was ordained a priest.

Returned to Transylvania, he became the vicar of the bishop of Făgăraş Inocenţiu Micu-Klein. When in 1744 Micu-Klein, because of his petitions for freedom for all Romanians, was exiled in Rome, in a short time Aron remained as the reference figure in the Church. He actually was appointed Vicar general of the diocese of Fagaras on 31 August 1745.

On 4 November 1751, following the forced resignation of Micu-Klein, the electoral synod convened and Aron resulted the more voted. Accordingly, on 28 February 1752 the Habsburg monarch, Empress Maria Theresa, designated him as new bishop and Pope Benedict XIV confirmed the designation on 6 July 1752. He was consecrated bishop on 1 September 1752 by M. Olsavszky, the Eparch of Mukachevo, in the monastery of Máriapócs.

As bishop, he strongly supported instruction, opening the first primary school in Blaj, establishing over fifty parish schools, and founding the diocesan printing press in Blaj. The pastoral activities of Aron were hindered by the disturbance of the Orthodox monk Sofronie, which took the proportions of a violent riot supported by the Serbians.

He died in Baia Mare on 9 March 1764.

Works
Petru Pavel Aron was a literate and a writer. His main works are:
 Our Holy Father John Damascene (in )
 Philosophic and Theological Works (in )
 Comforting letter about the divine inspiration of the Scriptures (in ), Blaj, 1761;
 Principles and definitions of the Council of Florence (in ), 1762;
 Principles of Christian doctrine (in ), 1764.
He also translated in Romanian the Bible from the Latin Vulgata version: Biblia Vulgata, Blaj, 1760-1761

Notes

External links
 

1709 births
1764 deaths
Translators of the Bible into Romanian
Primates of the Romanian Greek Catholic Church
People from Alba County
Romanian translators
Order of Saint Basil the Great
Romanian people in the Principality of Transylvania (1711–1867)
18th-century Eastern Catholic bishops
18th-century Romanian people
18th-century Christian biblical scholars
Roman Catholic biblical scholars
European biblical scholars
Romanian biblical scholars
18th-century translators